Govindas Ramdas was a Bhagat and a member of the Koli  tribe who led rebels against the British East India Company between 1826–1830. His followers thought that he had supernatural powers. Little is known of him but on the night of 17 March 1826, he led 500 armed followers into Thasra, near Dakor, and established himself as ruler.

Reference 

Indian rebels
Koli people